Sondre Solholm Johansen (born 7 July 1995) is a Norwegian professional footballer who plays as a centre-back for Odd in the Eliteserien.

Club career

Early career 
He played youth football for Asker, Lyn through 2014 and Strømsgodset from 2015. In 2016 he was drafted into the senior squad, playing one cup game. In the first half of 2017 he was loaned out to Mjøndalen, and when the loan was about to expire the move was made permanent.

Motherwell 
On 31 August 2021, Johansen moved to Scotland to join Scottish Premiership side Motherwell on a three-year contract. He made his debut for his new club on 11 September against Aberdeen.Solholm scored his first goal for the club in a 1-0 win over Dundee United On 31 January 2023, Motherwell announced the departure of Johansen to Odd for an undisclosed fee.

International career
Born and raised in Norway, In 2013 Johansen represented the Norwegian U-18 team in a pair of friendlies. In December 2021 he revealed he was eligible for the Canadian national team through his maternal grandmother, and would be interested in representing the nation should they approach him.

Career statistics

Club

References

External links

Profile at Norwegian FA

1995 births
Living people
People from Asker
Norwegian footballers
Norway youth international footballers
Norwegian people of Canadian descent
Norwegian expatriate footballers
Association football defenders
Strømsgodset Toppfotball players
Mjøndalen IF players
Motherwell F.C. players
Eliteserien players
Norwegian First Division players
Scottish Professional Football League players
Expatriate footballers in Scotland
Norwegian expatriate sportspeople in Scotland
Norwegian Third Division players
Norwegian Fourth Division players
Lyn Fotball players
Stabæk Fotball players
Sportspeople from Viken (county)

Odds BK players